Stollings is a surname. Notable people with the surname include:

 Marlene Stollings (born 1975), American basketball coach 
 Ron Stollings (born 1955), American politician

See also
 Stallings (surname)
 Stollings (disambiguation)